The Australian Film Institute Award for Best Screenplay (Original or Adapted) was an award presented intermittently by the Australian Film Institute (AFI), for an Australian screenplay written directly for the screen or based on previously released or published material. It was handed out at the Australian Film Institute Awards (known commonly as the AFI Awards), which are now the AACTA Awards after the establishment of the Australian Academy of Cinema and Television Arts (AACTA), by the AFI. The award was handed out from 1975-1977, 1980-1982, 1990-1992, and again in 2007; two separate awards were created for "Best Adapted Screenplay" and "Best Original Screenplay" and have been presented intermittently from 1978-1979, 1983-1989, 1993-2006, and then from 2008, onwards. The award was first presented at the 1974-75 awards as a film prize which included a cash reward of $A1000.

Winners and nominees
In the following table, films and screenwriters listed in bold, and in a blue background have received the special award; those listed in boldface and highlighted in gold are the winners of the competitive awards. Films and screenwriters that are not in boldface or highlighted are the nominees.

References

External links
The Australian Academy of Cinema and Television Arts Official website
Australian Film Institute: Past Winners Page

S
Screenwriting awards for film